Kathleen Klein is an American television writer.

Staff writer
All My Children (Hired by Wisner Washam; 1986–1993, 1995–2001)
Another World (1993-1994)
Guiding Light (1994-1995)

Awards and nominations
Writers Guild of America Award
Nomination, 1996, 1998, 2000 for Daytime Serials
Won, 1997, for Daytime Serials
Won, 1999, for Daytime Serials

Daytime Emmy Award
Won, 1988, for Outstanding Drama Series Writing Team 
Nomination, 1990 - 1994, 1999; for Outstanding Drama Series Writing Team
Won, 1996 - 1998; for Outstanding Drama Series Writing Team

External links

Variety

American soap opera writers
Living people
Writers Guild of America Award winners
Year of birth missing (living people)